Intendancy of Trujillo was one of the territorial divisions of the Viceroyalty of Peru. This territory was ruled from the city of Trujillo, located in La Libertad Region. It was created in 1784 and lasted until 12 February 1821 when General Jose de San Martin created the Trujillo Department to replace it in the new Republic of Peru.

Subdivisions
The Trujillo Intendancy was divided into the following 7 parts, called "Partidos":

Intendants 
The Governors (intendants) who ruled the intendence of Trujillo were:
Fernando de Saavedra (1784-1791)
Vicente Gil de Taboada (1791-1820)
José Bernardo de Tagle y Portocarrero (1820-1821)

Independence 

After General Jose de San Martin landed at Paracas in September 1820, the intendant José Bernardo de Tagle y Portocarrero and the city mayor led an independence movement that culminated with the declaration of the independence of the Intendancy of Trujillo on 29 December 1820. On 12 February 1821 Jose de San Martin issued a Provisional Regulation, providing for the creation of the Department of Trujillo.

See also
Independence Day of Trujillo
Independence of Trujillo
La Libertad Region

References
 John Fisher. El Perú borbónico 1750-1824. Lima: IEP, 2000.

History of Trujillo, Peru
History of La Libertad Region